Kikimora is a monotypic genus of dwarf spiders containing the single species, Kikimora palustris. It was first described by K. Y. Eskov in 1988, and has only been found in Finland, Norway, and Russia.

Derivation of name

When Eskov discovered this genus of sheetweaver spiders he used for it the name of the Russian bogeywoman (and personification of nightmare and sleep paralysis) Kikimora - specifically the type of Kikimora imagined to inhabit swamps (in further reference to the specific name palustris "of the marsh") and to be married to the forest-spirit Leshy.

See also
 List of Linyphiidae species (I–P)
 Kikimora
 Domovoy
 Folklore of Russia

References

Linyphiidae
Spiders described in 1988
Spiders of Europe
Spiders of Russia